Samuel Patterson or Sam Patterson may refer to:

 Samuel F. Patterson (1799–1874), North Carolina politician, planter, and businessman
 Samuel James Patterson (born 1948), Northern Irish mathematician
 Samuel L. Patterson (1850–1908), North Carolina politician and farmer
 Sam Patterson (fl. 1917), American football coach
 Sam Patterson (footballer) (born 1993), English footballer

See also
 Samuel Patterson House, in Derry Township, Westmoreland County, Pennsylvania, U.S.